The Roman Catholic Diocese of Francistown is a Roman Catholic diocese located in the city of Francistown, Botswana, in the Ecclesiastical province of Pretoria in South Africa.

History
 27 June 1998: Established as Apostolic Vicariate of Francistown from the Diocese of Gaborone.
 2 October 2017: Elevated to Diocese, suffragan to Pretoria.

Leadership
Vicar Apostolic of Francistown (Roman rite)
 Franklyn Nubuasah, S.V.D. (27 June 1998 – 2 October 2017)
Bishops of Francistown
 Franklyn Nubuasah, S.V.D. (2 October 2017 – 6 June 2019), appointed Bishop of Gaborone
 Anthony Pascal Rebello, S.V.D. (5 July 2021  – present)

References

External links
 GCatholic.org
 Catholic Hierarchy

Roman Catholic dioceses in Botswana
Christian organizations established in 2017
Francistown
Roman Catholic dioceses and prelatures established in the 21st century
Roman Catholic Ecclesiastical Province of Pretoria